Between the Earth and the Stars may refer to:

 Between the Earth and the Stars (Jeff Wood album), 1997
 Between the Earth and the Stars (Bonnie Tyler album), 2019